{{Infobox artist
| honorific_prefix = 
| name             = Stefano da Verona 
| honorific_suffix = 
| image            = Stefano da verona, adorazione dei magi, 1435, 47x72 cm, milano, pinacoteca di brera.jpg
| image_size       = 
| alt              = 
| caption          = Adoration of the Magi (1434)Pinacoteca di Brera, Milan.
| native_name      = 
| native_name_lang = 
| birth_name       = 
| birth_date       = 1379 
| birth_place      = 
| death_date       = 1438
| death_place      = 
| resting_place    = 
| resting_place_coordinates = 
| nationality      = Italian
| education        = 
| alma_mater       = 
| known_for        = 
| notable_works    = 
| style            = 
| movement         = 
| spouse           = 
| partner          = 
| awards           = 
| elected          = 
| patrons          = 
| memorials        = 
| website          = 
| module           = 
}}

Stefano da Verona (or da Zevio;  1379 – c. 1438) was an Italian painter who was active in Verona.

He was the son of the French painter Jean d'Arbois, who had come to Italy at the court for Gian Galeazzo Visconti after working for Philip II of Burgundy. He likely apprenticed at Pavia in the workshops of illuminators of the Visconti. He was influenced by Michelino da Besozzo, as it can be seen in the Madonna of the Rose Garden (1420s–1430s), variously attributed to him or Michelino.

Before settling in Verona, Stefano worked at Padua. In Verona he executed his major works, such as the Adoration of the Magi (now in the Pinacoteca di Brera), signed and dated 1434. A painting depicting The Virgin and Child with Angels in a Garden with a Rose Hedge'' at the Worcester Art Museum has been attributed to Stefano.

He was a friend of Pisanello, who was in Verona in the same period. Vincenzo di Stefano da Verona was likely a son or pupil. His brothers Giovanni Antonio and Giovanni Maria were also painters.

Notes

References

External links
Stefano da Verona on Artcyclopedia

1370s births
1430s deaths
14th-century Italian painters
Italian male painters
15th-century Italian painters
Gothic painters
Painters from Verona